Ralph Hutton (born March 6, 1948) is a former competition swimmer who represented Canada in three consecutive Olympic Games in 1964, 1968 and 1972.  Hutton won a silver medal in the 400-metre freestyle at the 1968 Summer Olympics in Mexico City.  Hutton won a total of 24 medals in international competitions, including the Summer Olympics, Commonwealth Games and Pan American Games.  He was inducted in the International Swimming Hall of Fame as an "Honor Swimmer" in 1984.

See also
 List of members of the International Swimming Hall of Fame
 List of Commonwealth Games medallists in swimming (men)
 List of Olympic medalists in swimming (men)
 World record progression 400 metres freestyle

References

1948 births
Living people
Canadian male backstroke swimmers
Canadian male butterfly swimmers
Canadian male freestyle swimmers
World record setters in swimming
Medalists at the 1968 Summer Olympics
Olympic silver medalists for Canada
Olympic swimmers of Canada
People from the Central Coast Regional District
Sportspeople from British Columbia
Swimmers at the 1964 Summer Olympics
Swimmers at the 1963 Pan American Games
Swimmers at the 1966 British Empire and Commonwealth Games
Swimmers at the 1967 Pan American Games
Swimmers at the 1968 Summer Olympics
Swimmers at the 1970 British Commonwealth Games
Swimmers at the 1971 Pan American Games
Swimmers at the 1972 Summer Olympics
Pan American Games gold medalists for Canada
Pan American Games silver medalists for Canada
Pan American Games bronze medalists for Canada
Olympic silver medalists in swimming
Commonwealth Games medallists in swimming
Commonwealth Games gold medallists for Canada
Commonwealth Games silver medallists for Canada
Commonwealth Games bronze medallists for Canada
Pan American Games medalists in swimming
Medalists at the 1963 Pan American Games
Medalists at the 1967 Pan American Games
Medalists at the 1971 Pan American Games
Medallists at the 1966 British Empire and Commonwealth Games
Medallists at the 1970 British Commonwealth Games